Stephan Musiol (born 16 April 1970), known professionally as Dero Goi, is a German singer, musician, songwriter and poet. He is best known as the former lead vocalist, drummer and founding member of Neue Deutsche Härte band Oomph! from 1989 to 2021.

Early life

Dero Goi was born in Wolfsburg on 16 April 1970, where he grew up with his former bandmate Andreas Crap. They lived in the same tenement housing department and both started playing music in grade school. They built "instruments" with Persil packs. Dero was introduced to music through his father, who was a guitarist and singer. Dero was "forced" to sing Elvis Presley songs with his father.

Career
Dero and Crap met Robert Flux at an indie festival in Wolfsburg in 1989. They found out that they liked the same kind of music and wanted to start a band, which would combine the rock and electro scene; thus, Oomph! was born. On their first tour they were just those three, and played the music playback, except Dero, who sang. Tobias "Tobi" Gloge, their first live bassist, was exchanged for Hagen Godicke in 2004.

When asked how Oomph! came up with their name, Dero said that the name was chosen because of its peculiarity.

"Because it was so strange to see that the name like that is existing. You know, with the two "o"s and the exclamation mark at the end. It was strange, you know, the visual aspect and pronunciation. And, you know, it’s always good to have a name where somebody is like "What was that?" You know, if your band name is like, I dunno, 'Toilet 2, 3, 4' it's, it's, I dunno... Your name has to be special. And this is a special name, definitely."

 – Dero Goi

In 2021, Dero Goi collaborated with Neue Deutsche Härte band Eisbrecher for one of the tracks, "Dagegen," on their new album Liebe macht Monster.

On 29 September 2021, it was announced that Dero will no longer be part of Oomph!.

Influences

Dero Goi noted several bands and artists that he listens to in an interview with the website Deutschmusikland, including Frank Sinatra, Björk, Tool, Elvis Presley, Korn, and Nine Inch Nails. Other bands Dero has been influenced by include The Cure, Killing Joke, AC/DC, Motörhead, Depeche Mode, The Beatles, and ABBA. The members of Oomph! listen to and have been influenced by a variety of artists, including  The Cure, Die Krupps, Depeche Mode, Nine Inch Nails, Deutsch Amerikanische Freundschaft, Einstürzende Neubauten, AC/DC, Garbage, Motörhead, and Korn.

References

External links
Oomph!'s official website

1970 births
Living people
Male drummers
21st-century German male singers
People from Wolfsburg
21st-century drummers